The Motor Sich Joint Stock Company is a Ukrainian aircraft engine manufacturer headquartered in Zaporizhzhia. The company manufactures engines for airplanes and helicopters, and also industrial marine gas turbines and installations.

Overview
Motor-Sich currently produces the Ivchenko Progress D-18 turbofan which powers variants of the Antonov An-124 and An-225 freighters, although the Ivchenko Progress D-36/Ivchenko Progress D-436 series remain the highest production-rate engines in the CIS.

Motor Sich inherited some of the former Soviet Union's aero engine manufacturing capabilities. It produces turbofan, turboprop and rotary-wing turboshaft engines that power aircraft in Russian service, such as Mi- and Ka-series military helicopters.

In 2017 Beijing's Skyrizon Aviation purchased a 41% holding in Motor Sich. Skyrizon Aviation had agreed to first invest $250 million in the Ukrainian Zaporizhzhia plants and help Motor Sich to set up a new assembly and servicing plant in Chongqing.

The company announced that it planned to launch its own helicopter, dubbed Hope, in 2018.

Some individuals, including former counsel to the US Senate Foreign Relation Committee William C. Triplet have criticized Ukraine for allowing Motor Sich to conduct business with Chinese firms. Oleh Lyashko, a leader of one of Ukraine’s parties said if the USA does not want Motor Sich to be closer with the Chinese, then they need to buy enough aircraft engines. Motor Sich severed ties with Russia in 2014, its biggest client, consequently put efforts to find new markets. In the administration of President Donald Trump, Washington added Skyrizon to a Military End-User (MEU) List. President Volodymyr Zelenskyy then signed a decree imposing sanctions on Skyrizon to restrict its trading operations, while the company responded with a $3.5 billion arbitration case. On 11 March 2021, the Ukrainian government announced that it confirmed to nationalize Motor Sich by buying back shares from Chinese holders. Oleksiy Danilov explained the government's decision is to "return Motor Sich to the Ukrainian people", "investors will be compensated" he added.

In May 2021, Ukraine is in discussions with Turkey to sell the company, it was reported a 50% stake to a Turkish company since it became a major buyer of Turboshaft engines for its Bayraktar TB2 and Bayraktar Akinci drones, and TAI T929 ATAK 2 helicopter. Director-General of Motor Sich, Vyacheslav Bohuslayev noted that a $100 million loan from China needs to be repaid in 2026.

Among the company's new products is the MS-500V turboshaft engine, originally intended for the Russian Ansat helicopter.

Seizure by government of Ukraine 
On November 6th, 2022 the government of President Volodymyr Zelenskiy used martial law to seize control of the company. “Such steps, which are necessary for our country in conditions of war, are carried out in accordance with current laws and will help meet the urgent needs of our defense sector.” The government of Ukraine also took control of energy companies Ukrnafta and Ukrtatnafta, vehicle maker AvtoKrAZ and transformer maker Zaporizhtransformator at the same time.

Components
 Zaporizhzhia Engine Engineering Factory, Zaporizhzhia
 Omelchenko Engineering Factory (1988), Zaporizhzhia
 Snizhne Engineering Factory (1970), Snizhne
 Volochysk Engineering Factory (1971), Volochysk
 Motor Sich Airlines (1984)
 Aleks TV (1995), local television company

In 2011 it acquired Orsha Engineering Factory, Orsha, Belarus.

Gallery

See also 
 Motor Sich Airlines
 Ivchenko-Progress
 List of aircraft engine manufacturers

References

External links

JSC Motor-Sich web site

 
Defence companies of Ukraine
Gas turbine manufacturers
Aircraft engine manufacturers of Ukraine
Aircraft engine manufacturers of the Soviet Union
Ukrainian brands
Ukroboronprom
Companies nationalised by the Soviet Union
1907 establishments in Ukraine
Companies based in Zaporizhzhia
Manufacturing companies established in 1907